Paul Deichmann (27 August 1898 – 10 January 1981) was a German general during World War II. He was a recipient of the Knight's Cross of the Iron Cross of Nazi Germany.

Deichmann was born in Fulda on 27 August 1898. He entered the German Imperial Army in 1916. Towards the end of 1920 he transferred to the 3rd Prussian Infantry Regiment, and in August 1925 was promoted to Oberleutnant. He was temporarily released from the Army in 1928 and returned to active duty in 1931 with the 1st Infantry Regiment, and was promoted to Hauptmann in 1933. With the official establishment of the German Luftwaffe in 1934, he entered the Reich Air Ministry. Deichmann died on 10 January 1981 in Hamburg.

Works
 Deichmann, Paul (1996). Spearhead for Blitzkrieg Luftwaffe Operations in Support of the Army, 1939 - 1945. New York: Ivy Book. .

Awards

 Knight's Cross of the Iron Cross on 26 March 1944 as Generalleutnant and commander of the 1. Flieger-Division.

References

 

1898 births
1981 deaths
People from Fulda
Luftwaffe World War II generals
Recipients of the Gold German Cross
Recipients of the clasp to the Iron Cross, 1st class
Recipients of the Knight's Cross of the Iron Cross
People from Hesse-Nassau
Prussian Army personnel
Reichswehr personnel
Luftstreitkräfte personnel
German Army personnel of World War I
Generals of Aviators
20th-century Freikorps personnel
Military personnel from Hesse